A boudin is a type of sausage.  It may also refer to:
 Boudin Bakery in San Francisco
 Boudinage, a geological feature
 Le Boudin, the march of the French Foreign Legion

People
Boudin (surname)

See also
Bodin (surname)